The 1550s decade ran from January 1, 1550, to December 31, 1559.

References